Les Laurentides (English: The Laurentians) is a regional county municipality in the Laurentides region of Quebec, Canada. The seat is in Mont-Blanc.  It is named after the Laurentian Mountains.

The population was 50,777 according to the 2021 Canadian Census.

Subdivisions
There are 20 subdivisions within the RCM:

Cities & Towns (3)
 Barkmere
 Mont-Tremblant
 Sainte-Agathe-des-Monts

Municipalities (13)
 Huberdeau
 Ivry-sur-le-Lac
 Labelle
 La Conception
 Lac-Supérieur
 Lac-Tremblant-Nord
 La Minerve
 Lantier
 Mont-Blanc
 Montcalm
 Sainte-Lucie-des-Laurentides
 Val-des-Lacs
 Val-Morin

Townships (2)
 Amherst
 Arundel

Parishes (1)
 Brébeuf

Villages (1)
 Val-David

Indian Reserves (1)
 Doncaster

Transportation

Access Routes
Highways and numbered routes that run through the municipality, including external routes that start or finish at the county border:

 Autoroutes
 

 Principal Highways
 

 Secondary Highways
 
 
 
 

 External Routes
 None

See also
 List of regional county municipalities and equivalent territories in Quebec

References

External links
 MRC des Laurentides

Regional county municipalities in Laurentides
Census divisions of Quebec